Lali may refer to:
Lali (drum), a type of drum used in Fiji
Lali, Humla. a village and municipality in Humla District in the Karnali Zone of northwestern Nepal
Lali, Mahakali, a village development committee in Darchula District in the Mahakali Zone of western Nepal
Lali (tribe), a Jat clan found in Punjab, Pakistan
Lali, Iran, a city in Khuzestan Province, Iran
Lali County, is a county in Khuzestan Province in Iran

People
 Lali Armengol (born 1945), Spanish playwright, professor and theater director
 Lali Singh (2008–2008), Indian girl with the diprosopus condition (two faces)
 Lali Kandelaki, Georgian ballerina
 Ali Askar Lali (born 1957), Afghan footballer
 Lali Chetwynd (born 1973), British artist
 Lali Kiknavelidze, Georgian film director
 Lali Espósito (born 1991), Argentinian actress, singer, model and entrepreneur
 Lali Tsipi Michaeli (born 1964), Israeli poet
 Lali Chichinadze, Georgian footballer